Ross Govans is a reporter and news editor for the Northern Scotland edition of STV News at Six.  He is also an occasional stand-in newsreader on short STV News bulletins for the region.

Before joining STV North (previously Grampian Television) in 2004, Govans was a journalist at Northsound Radio for ten years.

References

External links

Living people
STV News newsreaders and journalists
Year of birth missing (living people)